Loek Postma (born 5 March 2003) is a Dutch footballer who plays for Jong AZ.

Career
Postma moved from his home-town club FC Uitgeest to the academy of AZ in 2014. He was awarded his first professional contract with AZ in June 2021. The deal was for 3 years with the option of a fourth. Postma made his league debut on 22 April 2022 in a 3-3 draw with Excelsior Rotterdam in the Eerste Divisie at the Stadion Woudestein.

References

External links
 

Living people
2003 births
Dutch footballers
Eerste Divisie players
Jong AZ players
People from Uitgeest